The following is a list of current and historic sites frequently chosen to attempt suicide, usually by jumping. Some of the sites listed have installed suicide barriers, signs advising potential suicides to take other actions, and other precautions, such as crisis hotline phones.

Exact numbers of victims are sometimes difficult to determine, as many jurisdictions and media agencies have ceased collecting statistics and reporting suicides at common sites, in the belief that the reporting may encourage others.

Most frequently used locations
 Nanjing Yangtze River Bridge, Nanjing, China – more than 2,000 suicides from 1968 to 2006
 Golden Gate Bridge, San Francisco, California, United States – more than 1,600 known suicides; the number is believed to be higher because of people whose bodies were never found.
 Prince Edward Viaduct, Toronto, Ontario, Canada – 492 suicides before the Luminous Veil, a barrier of 9,000 steel rods, was constructed in 2003.
 Aokigahara forest, Mount Fuji, Japan – as many as 105 suicides a year, though the number may be higher.
 The Gap, Sydney, New South Wales, Australia – a large sea cliff with roughly 50 suicides a year
 Kota, Japan – as many as 5-10 suicides a year

Locations by continent

Africa
 Ponte apartment building, Johannesburg
 Van Stadens Bridge, Eastern Cape, South Africa – 88 suicides since construction in 1971.
Cairo Tower, Cairo, Egypt

Asia

Aokigahara forest, Mount Fuji, Japan – up to 105 suicides a year
Delhi Metro, India – at least 83 suicides
 Han River, South Korea
Hussain Sagar, India – 146 deaths and 510 attempts between 2013 and 2016
 Mapo Bridge, Seoul, South Korea
 Milad Tower, Tehran, Iran – Until 2012, three suicides occurred by persons jumping from Milad Tower.
 Mount Mihara, Japan – an active volcano on the island of Izu Ōshima. After a suicide in 1933, media reports led to hundreds of copycats until 1936, when access was restricted.
 Nanjing Yangtze River Bridge, China – over 2,000 suicides since 1968, ~50/year.
 Shin-Koiwa Station, Japan
 Tehran Metro, Tehran, Iran
 Tojinbo, Japan
 Wuhan Yangtze River Bridge, Wuhan, China – 24.7 suicides per year
 Burj Khalifa, Dubai, United Arab Emirates
 Rabindra Sarobar metro station, India

Europe

 25 de Abril Bridge, Lisbon, Portugal
 Älvsborg Bridge, Gothenburg, Sweden
 Archway Bridge, Highgate, London, United Kingdom.
 Beachy Head, Sussex, England, United Kingdom – 20 suicides a year
 Bosphorus Bridge, Istanbul
 Cliffs of Moher, County Clare, Ireland – four prevented suicides in 2008
 Clifton Suspension Bridge, Bristol, England, United Kingdom – more than 500 suicides since opening in 1864. Suicide barriers were installed in 1998, which halved the suicide rate over the years following.
 Erskine Bridge, Erskine, Scotland, United Kingdom.
 Forth Road Bridge, Scotland, United Kingdom – estimated over 20 suicides a year – more than 800 since the bridge opened in 1964*
 Foyle Bridge, Derry, Northern Ireland, United Kingdom – more than 90 suicides since 1984
 Göltzsch Viaduct, Reichenbach im Vogtland, Germany – exemplary attraction for attempting suicide in Germany, under continued supervision by the Federal Police, scene of a 2001 suicide pact that led to the 2002 documentary Teuflische Spiele (Diabolical Games).
 Grand Duchess Charlotte Bridge, Luxembourg City, Luxembourg – more than 100 suicides since opening in 1966. Since 1993, a Plexiglas barrier has prevented people from jumping off the bridge and falling on top of the houses below.
 Humber Bridge, Kingston-upon-Hull, East Riding of Yorkshire, England, United Kingdom – more than 200 incidents of people jumping or falling from the bridge took place in the first 26 years after it opened in 1981.
 Kocher Viaduct, Germany - highest bridge in the country. A suicide barrier was installed on the bridge after an unusually high 48 suicides between 1979 and 1990.
 London Underground, London, United Kingdom – ~50 attempts annually
 The Monument, London, United Kingdom – was the site of six suicides between 1788 and 1842, when the gallery was enclosed by an iron cage to prevent such misfortunes occurring again.
 Nusle Bridge, Prague, Czech Republic – At least 365 deaths.
 Paris Métro, Paris metropolitan area, France – 20 to 40 deaths per year.
 Segovia Viaduct, Madrid, Spain – colloquially called the suicide bridge, starting from the 17th century until the 1990s, when it saw fatal falls at an average of one a week. A barrier was erected in 1998.
 Southerndown, South Wales, United Kingdom - well-known in the local area for suicides; at least 9 between 2000 and 2003.
 Türisalu cliff, Estonia
 Västerbron Stockholm Sweden

North America

 Arrigoni Bridge, Middletown, Connecticut
 Colorado Street Bridge in Pasadena, California, has been the host of numerous falls/jumps starting as early as its construction, when a worker who had been drinking fell off the bridge into wet cement. It has hosted many suicides since, and a large barrier/fence has been installed to keep people from jumping.
 Coronado Bridge (also known as San Diego–Coronado Bridge), San Diego, California – more than 200 suicides (1972–2000)
 Foresthill Bridge in Auburn, California – estimated 65 suicides since construction in 1973, actual number likely higher
 George Washington Bridge between New Jersey and New York City – It has been averaging around 10 suicides per year and a record 18 in 2012.  Tyler Clementi jumped from the bridge in 2010 after being cyberbullied.
 George Washington Memorial Bridge ("Aurora Bridge"), Seattle, Washington – more than 230 suicides since 1932, with more than 50 from 1997 to 2007
 Golden Gate Bridge, San Francisco, California – official count halted at 997 to prevent "record breakers"
 Governor Thomas Johnson Bridge, Southern Maryland
 Jacques Cartier Bridge, Montreal, Quebec – more than 143 suicides. Suicide barriers were erected in 2004.
 New River Gorge Bridge in Fayetteville, West Virginia
 Niagara Falls – between 1856 and 1995 there were 2,780 known suicides; and there are 20 to 25 per year.
 Prince Edward Viaduct, Toronto, Ontario – A suicide barrier was installed in 2003.
 Sunshine Skyway Bridge, Tampa Bay, Florida – At least 264 suicides by jumping from the center span into the waters of Tampa Bay since the opening of the new bridge in 1987. In response, the State of Florida installed  crisis hotline phones and began 24-hour patrols. The song, "Skyway Avenue", by We The Kings is about two lovers who decide to jump to their deaths together from this bridge.
 Tappan Zee Bridge, Tarrytown, New York – more than 30 suicides between 2002 and 2012; sometimes referred to as "the Golden Gate Bridge of the East" This bridge was replaced in 2017 by a new twin span with fencing on its pedestrian/bicycle path to deter jumpers.
 Toronto Transit Commission subway and rapid transit network – 150 people have killed themselves, and there have been an additional 100 attempts between 1998 and 2007.
 Vessel, New York City, New York – In the less than two years that the Vessel was open to the public, four people jumped to their deaths. After the first three deaths, some limited changes were made to prevent suicide. Following the fourth death, however, the Vessel has been closed indefinitely.
 Vista Bridge, Portland, Oregon

Oceania

 Grafton Bridge, Auckland, New Zealand – suicide barriers were removed in 1996 after being in place for sixty years but replaced in 2003.
 Lawyer's Head, Dunedin, New Zealand.
 The Gap, Sydney – estimated to have roughly 50 suicides a year
 West Gate Bridge, Melbourne – Had "up to one" suicide every three weeks. Suicide rates on the bridge have dropped by 85% since prevention barriers were installed by the state government in 2009.
 Echo Point, Katoomba, Blue Mountains, New South Wales

South America
 Eduardo Villena Rey Bridge in Lima, Peru. The bridge had to be covered with large windows due to suicide rates. The street under the bridge is believed to be haunted.
 São Paulo Metro, São Paulo, Brazil. The Metro, as other subway networks in Brazil, have a policy not to publicly disclose the number of suicides taking place in any given period to prevent further attempts.
Third Bridge, Vitória, Brazil. The construction of a suicide prevention net is currently being discussed by public authorities and the concessionary of the bridge.
 Viaducto García Cadena, Bucaramanga, Colombia
 Costanera Center, Santiago, Chile

See also
 Lover's Leap
 Suicide bridge
 Suicide tourism

References

Suicide sites
Suicide-related lists